The individual eventing in equestrian at the 2018 Asian Games was held at the Jakarta International Equestrian Park from 24 to 26 August 2018.

Schedule
All times are Western Indonesia Time (UTC+07:00)

Results
Legend
EL — Eliminated
WD — Withdrawn

References

External links
Dressage results
Cross-country results
Jumping results

Individual eventing